Malta has participated in the  Eurovision Song Contest 34 times since its debut in . The contest is broadcast in Malta on the PBS channel, TVM. Malta has yet to win the contest, but is the only non-winning country to have achieved four top three results.

Malta has participated every year since. Malta's return proved more successful, reaching the top 10 in 12 out of 15 contests from 1991 to 2005, including third-place results for Mary Spiteri and Chiara and second-place results for Ira Losco and Chiara.

History
Malta first participated at Eurovision in 1971, although the history of National song contests organized in the Maltese islands dates back to 1960 when the first Malta Song Festival took place. Malta has never won the contest, although it has twice finished second and twice finished third.

Malta's return to the contest in 1991, after a 16-year absence, proved to be more successful, with eight consecutive top 10 placings (1991–1998) and finishing in the top 10 in 12 out of 15 contests from 1991 to 2005. Malta's two second-places and two third-places make it the most successful country not to win the contest.

Together with France, Spain, Sweden and the United Kingdom, Malta is one of the few countries that has not missed a contest since 1991. All of Malta's entries since 1991 have been sung in its other official language, English, which it was one of the few countries allowed to use in the contest between 1977 and 1999, being a former British colony which (as seen below) has had a close relationship with the UK within the contest. The only use of the Maltese language was three lines in the 2000 entry "Desire", performed by Claudette Pace. The Maltese broadcasters of the show are the Public Broadcasting Services (PBS). All shows are transmitted live on TVM and Radio Malta. Also, along with Croatia and Sweden it was the only country never to be relegated, under the previous rules of the contest, that was not a part of the "Big Four".

Selection process

Malta uses a televised national final to select its entry. From its debut in 1971 through 1976, Malta Song Festival, an existing song festival that had been created in 1960 was used to select the entrant, with the winner going to represent the country at the Eurovision Song Contest. Malta did not participate in the contest between 1977 and 1990. Since its return in 1991, national finals under various names were held to select the entry, including Malta Song for Europe, Malta Eurovision Song Contest, and Malta Eurosong. During this time period, the organization of the event was taken over by the Maltese broadcaster Public Broadcasting Services (PBS).

A typical Maltese national final would consist of: the rules for submissions by composers, authors, and singers being published in October, first elimination rounds in December, and semi-finalists announced in January. The semi-final would then be held in February, followed two days later by a final to choose Malta's representative at the contest. In 2009, a new format of the contest was introduced, the Malta Eurosong contest, with eight semi-finals held over November 2008 to January 2009, and a final of 20 songs competing in February. In 2010 six semi-finals were held over December 2009 and January 2010, and a final was once again held in February 2010. This format was discontinued for the 2019 and 2020 contests, with PBS instead using X Factor Malta to select the artist. The national final format returned for the 2022 contest.

Participation overview

Awards

Marcel Bezençon Awards

Winner by OGAE members

Barbara Dex Award

Related involvement

Commentators and spokespersons

Gallery

Notes

Further reading

References

External links
 ESCMalta Community website
 EurovisionMalta.com
 Points to and from Malta eurovisioncovers.co.uk
 OGAE Malta - The local branch of the official Eurovision Fans Club

 
Countries in the Eurovision Song Contest